Arion fuscus, also known as the "dusky arion", is a species of small air-breathing land slug, a terrestrial pulmonate gastropod mollusk in the family Arionidae, the roundback slugs.

Arion subfuscus (Draparnaud, 1805) is considered by some authors to be a partial synonym for Arion fuscus. Arion subfuscus (Draparnaud, 1805) and A. fuscus (Müller, 1774) have very similar morphology and have overlapping distributional ranges in northwestern Europe. Arion fuscus is widespread throughout Central, North and East Europe whereas A. subfuscus is restricted to West Europe. (For practical purposes the two are synonyms in Germany and in the Czech Republic.) The two taxa are referred to as the species complex Arion subfuscus/fuscus both members having several evolutionary lineages. They are only separable by alloenzyme analysis and gonad type.

Description
A 50–70 mm roundback slug. It is brown in colour, ranging from black-brown through olive-brown to orange and bright reddish-orange. Darker lateral bands are present. Dark pigment reaches under the pneumostome from back to front. The foot fringe is pale with thin lines. The sole is uniformly pale/translucent.The tentacles are pale or dark. It does not contract into a bell shape when stimulated. The Dusky Arion differs from other Arion species in its yellow-orange body mucus.
Genitalia:Atrium about half diameter of spermatheca, spermatheca spherical, oviduct large and swollen like in Arion lusitanicus

Distribution
This species occurs in European and Asian countries and islands including:

 Austria
 Bulgaria
 Czech Republic - least concern (LC)
 Germany
 Netherlands
 Poland
 Slovakia
 Great Britain
 Ireland
 China
 and other areas

Habitat
This slug lives under fallen logs and under bark in woodland areas, but it also lives in hedges, gardens, pastures and dunes.

References

Further reading
 Pinceel J., Joardens K., Van Houtte N., De Winter A.J. & Backeljau T. 2004: Molecular and morphological data reveal cryptic taxonomic diversity in the terrestrial slug complex Arion subfuscus/fuscus (Mollusca, Pulmonata, Arionidae) in continental north-west Europe. Biological Journal of the Linnean Society 83: 23–38. 
 Pinceel J., Joardens K., Pfenninger M. & Backeljau T. 2005: Rangewide phylogeography of a terrestrial slug in Europe: evidence for Alpine refugia and rapid colonization after the Pleistocene glaciations. Molecular Ecology 14: 1133–1150. 
 
 "Activity and Ecological Distribution of the Slug, Arion subfuscus (Draparnaud) (Stylommatophora, Arionidae)". 
 "Relations between forest management and slug assemblages (Gastropoda) of deciduous regrowth forests".

External links
Arion subfuscus at Animalbase taxonomy,short description, distribution, biology,status (threats), images 
Arion subfuscus at Encyclopedia of Life

Arion (gastropod)
Gastropods of Europe
Gastropods of Asia
Fauna of England
Gastropods described in 1774
Taxa named by Otto Friedrich Müller